Michael Kent Livingston (born September 21, 1948) is an American rower who competed in the 1972 Summer Olympics.

He was born in Denver and is the younger brother of Cleve Livingston.

In 1972 he was a crew member of the American boat which won the silver medal in the eights event.

Livingston was the head coach of the University of California Men's Rowing team from 1981 through 1984.

He graduated from Harvard University.

References

External links
 

1948 births
Living people
Rowers at the 1972 Summer Olympics
Olympic silver medalists for the United States in rowing
American male rowers
California Golden Bears rowing coaches
Medalists at the 1972 Summer Olympics
Harvard Crimson rowers